The National Police Agency, Ministry of the Interior (NPA) is an agency under the Ministry of the Interior of the Republic of China (Taiwan) which oversees all police forces on a national level. The National Police Agency is headquartered in Taipei City.

Police Organization & Structure

Hierarchy
Most actual law enforcement and day-to-day policing duties are delegated to local police departments on a city and county level which answer to the NPA but are considered agencies of their local government. However the NPA has direct control over several specialized units which may be deployed to assist local forces, as well as the national highway patrol.

Unlike the police system in the United States, the central government appoints the head positions of city and county Police Departments in the ROC and thus forms a solid chain of command for all police personnel. By calling a personnel review board, the Director-General of NPA has the full control of personnel rotation and transfer, as well as administrative commendations and reprimands over all high ranking police officers, including chiefs of local police departments.

One exception is the President of the Central Police University, who is directly subordinate to the Minister of the Interior, and is not subject to the NPA personnel review board.

 Executive Yuan
 Ministry of the Interior
 National Police Agency
 NPA Units/City and County Police Departments (縣市警察局)
 Precinct/Division/Squad
 Station
 Beat

NPA Units

In addition to its own internal administrative offices, the NPA has direct control over the following units and agencies:

Criminal Investigation Bureau

The Criminal Investigation Bureau (CIB) is responsible for the investigation of high-profile crimes, forensics, and computer-related crimes. Under its command, are the following field and staff sections:
Crime Prevention and Detection Command Center: Code-named Telephone Extension Number 8.
Crime Prevention Section
Crime Investigation Section
Anti-Hoodlum Section
Laws & Regulations Research Section
Criminal Records Section
International Criminal Affairs Section
INTERPOL Radio Center
Research & Development Office
Public Relations Office
Logistics Section
Secretariat
Internal Affairs Office
Public Security Office
Personnel Office
Accounting Office

There are also nine active field police squads
1st brigade: Homicide or unregistered weapons.
2nd brigade: Robbery or sex-related crimes.
3rd brigade: Controlled substances or organized crime.
4th brigade: Burglary, kidnapping or blackmail.
5th brigade: Bombs or explosives.
6th and 8th brigades: Rapid reaction units in central and southern Taiwan.
7th brigade: Financial crimes.
9th brigade: Cybercrimes.

Two task-force-grouped centers include:
Forensic Science Center:
 Forensic Section(Criminalistics Office): The Emeritus consultant is Henry Chang-Yu Lee, Ph.D., in Connecticut, United States.
 Forensic Biology Office(Medical Examiner Office): The Emeritus consultant is Yang Zi-song(:zh:楊日松), M.D., retired.
 Fingerprint Office
High-Technology Crime Prevention Center: It formed on April 6th, 2006.
9th brigade
Electronic surveillance and monitoring center (on cellular telephone networks in private corporations, such as FET)
Information management office

Special Operations Group (SOG)
There are 7 individual Special Operations Groups, literally "Special Police Crops"(保安警察隊). These are mobile, rapid deployment police forces. They also execute various sentry duties and serve as a pool of reserve formations for police manpower.
 
Three task-force-grouped SWAT units (referred to as Peace Enforcing Special Service Forces or "Wei-An" Forces(:zh:維安特勤隊) comprise the 1st, 4th and 5th Special Operations Groups. The mission of the SOG include counter-terrorism, counter-hijacking, high-profile hostage rescue, and presidential protection. In recent years they have also been involved in the arrest of heavily armed fugitives. The uniforms and equipment of the SOG units are similar to local SWAT units, which are referred to as Thunder Squads. The Thunder Squads are subordinate to local police departments.

The First Corps
A training base for courses of on-the-job training and mobile task force. Riot control, Special Weapons and Tactics, counter-terrorism in northern Taiwan. It commands six special police brigades and one "Wei-an" Forces(:zh:維安特勤隊). Three brigades of conscripts, 2nd, 5th and 6th, served like combat police in Korea, are usually deployed for Riot control.
Corps Headquarters, 2nd, 3rd, 4th brigades, and one "Wei-An" Forces, are stationed in Si-pai, Taipei City.
"Wei-an" Forces: Formed in June 1992. Its mission specialties are counter-terrorism, high-profile hostage rescues, and presidential protection. These forces are composed of SWAT units divided into two companies, which are supported by the 3rd brigade.
1st and 5th brigades are stationed in Sanxia District, New Taipei City.
The 6th brigade is stationed in Bade District, Taoyuan City.

The Second Corps
There are 4 brigades commended by the Ministry of Economic Affairs. It is for security duty of all governmental business units and Taiwan Power Company under the Ministry of Economic Affairs and all Science Parks of National Science Council. 
The first brigade is especially tasked for the copyright protection and the enforcement of counterfeit and infringement in related to intellectual property. It is usually code-named as Intellectual Property Protection Brigade.
The 2nd is to guard three nuclear power plants (Nuclear No.1, No.2, and No.4) of Taiwan Power Company in New Taipei City.
The 3rd is in northern Taiwan for the security duty of two Science Parks in Hsinchu and Taichung under National Science Council, and the other industrial parks, import-export districts, and certain government installations of the Ministry of Economic Affairs.
The 4th is in southern Taiwan for the security duty of all governmental business installations under the National Science Council and the Ministry of Economic Affairs, which includes one nuclear power plant: "Nuclear No.3."

The Third Corps
It is a part of border police and provides supportive and supplemental duty of Customs Services of Ministry of Finance.

The Fourth Corps
Riot control, Special Weapons and Tactics, counter-terrorism in central Taiwan.
"Wei-an" Forces: In March 2003, two more task force-sized SWAT groups of "Wei-an" Forces were formed. One of them is attached to the 4th Special Police Corps in Taichung, which is located in central Taiwan.

The Fifth Corps
Riot control, Special Weapons and Tactics, counter-terrorism in southern Taiwan.
"Wei-an" Forces: In March 2003, two task-force SWAT groups were formed. One is attached to the 5th Special Police Corps in southern Taiwan.

The Sixth Corps
Responsible for the physical security of central government buildings, high-ranking civilian officials, foreign embassies, and liaison institutes.

The Seventh Corps
The Seventh Special Police Corps, 7SPC, was established on January 1st, 2014, aiming to solve the growing problems of nature reservation, environment protection and forest and National Parks guarding.
The design of 7SPC is close to National Parks rangers in USA, who are officials employed by government to provide law and order (often against poaching). Their duties are originally confined to seeing that the Forest Law, National Parks Law and Environment Protection Law and so on.

Taiwan Special Police Corps
There are 6 Special Police Brigades inherited from the late Taiwan Provincial Police Administration.
The first 3 brigades are for the security duty of 3 governmental financial banks: Taiwan Land Bank, Taiwan Cooperative Bank, and Bank of Taiwan.
The 4th is to guard the government installations related to the late Taiwan Province.
The 5th and 6th are attached to Water Resources Agency (水利署), Ministry of Economic Affairs to protect the water supply and water-and-land-related environmental cases.

Civil Defense Force
The Civil Defense Force (民防防情指揮管制所) is administered by the NPA.

Other NPA Units

The Immigration Office (入出境管理局) is removed from NPA and attached to the National Immigration Agency and since 2 January 2007.
National Highway Police Bureau (國道公路警察局): Jurisdiction over national highways.

Harbor Police Offices (港務警察局): Part of border police in Taiwan. There are 4 separate offices with jurisdictions over the ports of Keelung, Taichung, Kaohsiung and Hualien.
Railway Police Bureau (鐵路警察局): Jurisdiction over stations and facilities of Taiwan Railway Administration since 1949 and Taiwan High Speed Rail since 26 December 2006.
The 1st section: facilities of TRA, north of Taichung in western Taiwan
The 2nd section: facilities of TRA, south of Taichung in western Taiwan
The 3rd section: facilities of TRA in eastern Taiwan
The THSR section: facilities of THSR
Aviation Police Bureau (航空警察局): The Airport police is a part of border police and responsible for safeguarding, traffic administration, crime investigation, documents inspection, security examination etc. at local civil airports in the ROC. Its headquarters is at Taiwan Taoyuan International Airport.
National Park Police Corps (國家公園警察大隊): Jurisdiction over the national parks, specialization in search and rescue operations.
Taiwan Police College
Police Armory (警察機械修理廠)
Police Telecommunications Office (警察電訊所)
 Police Radio Station (警察廣播電臺): A government public radio station run by civilians. It broadcasts regular radio show programs, news, and real-time traffic situations.

Task-Force Formations under NPA 
By separate decrees of The Executive Yuan, three task-force formations, each consisted of roughly a couple of hundreds police officers with different specialty, are formed under the National Police Agency but attached to two cabinet-level institutions or other units.
Telecommunication Police Corps (電信警察隊): In January 1998, a task force called the "Telecommunication Police Corps" was formed and attached to the Ministry of Transportation and Communications. Since 2 February 2006, the Telecommunication Police Corps are re-attached to the National Communication Commission. Its job is to enforce laws concerning the radio spectrum and telecommunications.
Environmental Protection Police Corps (環保警察隊): It was formed in 1999 and is attached to the Environmental Protection Administration. There are currently 192 policemen serving as Environmental Protection Police and assigned to three brigades at Taipei City, Taichung City and Fongshan City in Northern, Central and Southern Taiwan, respectively.
Forest & Nature Conservation Police Unit (森林暨自然保育警察隊): This was formed with 178 policemen on 1 July 2004 by the decree of the Executive Yuan on 6 August 2003, after ten forest arson cases in the mountain area of Taichung County (now part of Taichung City) within six years. It is attached to the Forest Bureau of the Council of Agriculture. Besides its headquarters in Taipei City, there are 8 squadrons in Taiwan mountain area. Its main task is to support the forest patrolmen to preserve and protect the ecology system and all historic monuments in all the forests in Taiwan.

Ranks
Rank insignias are worn over the right breast pocket when in uniform. The rank system of the National Police Agency is as follows:

Before 1999, the lowest-grade street policemen held the rank of Police Officer II, denoted by an insignia of two stars on one horizontal bar, sometimes referred to colloquially as "一毛二" or "one dime and two cents." On 3 March 1999, an adjustment of "the table of police positions and corresponding ranks" or "各級警察機關學校警察官職務配階表", from the Ministry of Interior resulted in regular policemen or women on street holding the rank of Senior Police Officer, denoted by "three stars on one horizontal bar", nicknamed "一毛三" or "one dime and three cents."

To emphasize the independence of the ranks and the professions, the rank of ROC police may not perfectly match their positions in a station. In 2007, a highest rank above Police Supervisor Rank 1 is created for the highest position, Police General, who is in charge of and oversees the public safety of the entire nation.

History
The current police service in Taiwan traces its roots back to police forces established in Taiwan during Japanese colonial rule, as well as police services established in Mainland China during the early 20th Century.

The ROC's law enforcement system built upon the foundations laid down during the Qing Dynasty with the establishment of the Peking Public Inspection Headquarters in 1902. Following the overthrow of the Qing Dynasty and the establishment of the Republic in 1912, a National Police Department was established under the auspices of the Ministry of the Interior. This early centralized system consisted of a national headquarters in the capital, provincial police administrations for each province, police departments and bureaus at the municipal and county level respectively. This system was extended to Taiwan following its transfer to ROC control in 1947, two years after the close of hostilities in World War II, though the basic system from the Japanese era was retained.

In 1972, to streamline organizational costs, the National Police Department was merged with the Taiwan Police Administration to form the new National Police Agency (NPA).

The first 4 Directors-General of NPA, between 1972 and 1990, were active general officers transferred from Army or Marine Corps:
Chou Ju-cun (周菊村), between 1972 and 1976;
Kong Ling-Cheng (:zh:孔令晟), between 1976 and June 1980;
Ho En-ting (何恩廷), between June 1980 and 1 August 1984;
Luo Chang (羅張), between 1 August 1984 and 4 August 1990.
The latter three even served as two-star Marine Corps Commandants.

Secret police organizations 
Historically speaking, in Taiwan, unlike Special Higher Police (Tokko) and the Japanese Military police (Kempeitai) during the Japanese Colonial era, the secret police activity was not the major task of Taiwan police system during the Martial-Law era.

The Taiwan police system at that time only played as a supportive role, like performing frequent surveillance, for example. Nevertheless, the governmental body of Taiwan police system back then was and still is subjective to the supervision and coordination of National Security Bureau of the ROC National Security Council. The main secret-police work were held up by other security units listed below. Several units in the past like National Security Bureau or National Bureau of Investigation were much more fearful or despicable to the people of Taiwan. However, by the end of the Martial-Law era, these so-called "secret police" units were legalized, transformed into intelligence-oriented or law-enforcement units, or even disbanded.

The typical secret-police example of the involvement from several security units is Peng Ming-min, the famous Taiwanese political prisoner since the 1960s. Tipped off by several civilians, Peng was at first arrested by a police detail from local police station in Taipei City. Immediately, he was sent to Taiwan Garrison Command for interrogation, which was led by its Division of Political Warfare. Sequentially, Peng was courted-martial by a military tribunal organized by "Division of Judge Advocate General" of Taiwan Garrison Command. Peng was pardoned in 1965 but put under house arrest. In 1966, Peng's case was then discussed by National Security Council and transferred from Taiwan Garrison Command to Bureau of Investigation. Until his escape in January, 1970, Peng was under the regular visits from local policemen and constant surveillance from agents of Bureau of Investigation.

Post-Martial Law era reforms
In 1990, Chuang Heng-dai (莊亨岱), by then the Commissioner of Railway Police Bureau, became the first career police officer with the background of a criminal investigator to take over the chief of NPA. Since then, all the successive directors-general of NPA are promoted from career police officers in active duty within the Taiwan police system.

The Taiwan Provincial Police Administration was again separated from the NPA in 1995 with the implementation of local autonomy statutes in the ROC Constitution. Fire-fighting units also ceased to be part of the NPA from that year and were reorganized into a separate fire department. National Fire Agency of Ministry of Interior was established on 1 March 1995 to be responsible for fire prevention, disaster rescue and emergency medical service.

In 1999, with the downsizing of the provincial level of government, the Taiwan Provincial Police Administration was dissolved and its personnel and responsibilities were once again transferred to the National Police Agency.

An increase in crime and liberalization of the mass media in the 1990s led to many questions concerning the effectiveness of the police force in investigating and fighting crime, as opposed to its prior concentration on crowd and riot control, a carryover from the martial law era.

Recent years
With increased media coverage in recent years and the proliferation of tabloid newspapers and 24-hour cable news channels throughout Taiwan, the police force has been faced with new challenges involving high-profile crimes, and increased media involvement. Past concerns of police corruption have largely been replaced by concerns of police ineffectiveness, particularly in light of several high-profile cases in recent years. Gun related crime has also increased, though the overall crime rate in Taiwan remains lower than that of most western and Asian nations.

On 22 July 2000, four workers carrying out riverbed construction work in the Pachang River of Chiayi County, were surrounded by the quickly rising torrent on Saturday afternoon. The four stood in the center of the river for three hours, waiting for a helicopter that never came, and were finally washed away at around 7:08pm in sight of family members, helpless would-be rescuers, and the lens of news cameras on the riverbank. The delay was attributed to bureaucratic red tape and three top government officials resigned, including Yu Shyi-kun, the vice Premier of Executive Yuan and two Director-Generals from National Police Agency and National Fire Agency. This Pachang-Creek incident (:zh:八掌溪事件) caused a field day for the news media in Taiwan and triggered a reform of the airborne emergency management system. On 10 March 2004, the newly formed National Airborne Service Corps (NASC) of the Ministry of Interior absorbed four civil airborne squadrons
The Airborne Squadron of National Police Agency,
The Preparatory Office of the Airborne Fire Fighting Squadron of National Fire Agency,
The Aviation Team of Civil Aeronautics Administration of Ministry of Transportation and Communications,
The Air Patrol Squadron of the Coast Guard Administration.
NASC takes over the responsibilities of five major airborne tasks:Search and Rescue, Disaster Relief, Emergency Medical Services, Reconnaissance and Patrol, and Transportation.

On 26 July 2004, members of the Criminal Investigation Bureau engaged in what was arguably the largest gun battle in the history of modern Taiwan with members of a kidnapping gang in Kaohsiung County (now part of Kaohsiung City). Though they held a numerical advantage, the officers found themselves outgunned by the suspects who possessed bulletproof vests and M16's. In the ensuing gunfight four police officers were injured, and two suspects were shot and arrested. However the ringleader of the gang managed to escape along with a cohort after holding a passing civilian hostage and escaping in a hijacked car on live TV. The ensuing manhunt was widely covered, the ringleader ) was finally arrested following another gun battle with police on 13 July 2005.

On 28 February 2006, Hou You-yi, the Criminal Investigation Bureau Commissioner, assumed command as the director-general of the National Police Agency. He, a career criminal investigator, is the youngest-ever to hold that post. , Chief of Taipei City Police Department, was named as the new director-general effective June 2008.

On 2 Jan 2007, according to "the Organic Law of the National Immigration Agency" enacted on 30 Nov 2005, the NPA's former Immigration Office was expanded to become the National Immigration Agency under the direct control of the Ministry of the Interior, and Wu Cheng-chi (吳振吉) was named the first director general of NIA.

Other duties
In addition to normal law enforcement duties, police in the ROC are charged with other slightly more unusual duties such as taking census data, as well as immigration and visa related issues. Most jurisdictions also have a Foreign Affairs squad staffed by English speaking officers tasked with visa enforcement and issues relating to foreigners or the foreign community in Taiwan.

Interdepartmental cooperation

Bureau of Investigation

Regarding drugs, corruptions, espionage, and economic crimes, the Investigative Bureau of Ministry of Justice (MJIB) has developed stronger capability to cover cases in those categories for decades. The investigation of these cases, police corruption included, are usually transferred to or led by the Bureau of Investigation.

MJIB officers are equipped with a strong laboratory-testing capacity regarding controlled substances. This gives a necessary advantage and training for the investigators of MJIB. However, the police forces in the ROC still maintain several active drug enforcement squads at the local police departments and the Criminal Investigation Bureau of NPA.

Historically, counter-intelligence affairs are under the turf of MJIB. Different from "special branch" in the police system in United Kingdom, the security divisions at all levels of Taiwan police system are mainly staff units, not fielded police details. Under the supervision of National Security Bureau, all non-mililary cases of espionage would soon be moved to the Bureau of Investigation.

A few years ago, high-ranking police officials tried to develop the strength of investigating white-collar crimes in the ROC police system but gained unnoticed progress. The MJIB is still in the lead position of cracking economic crimes or money-laundry. However, the Criminal Investigation Bureau of NPA has built fair reputation on copyright protection and the safety of computers and networks. Also, regarding the copyright issue, the 1st brigade of the 2nd special police corps is especially tasked for the enforcement related to intellectual property.

Military Police 

According to the "Law of the dispatching of Judicial Police Personnel," military police can deal with civilian affairs under the supervision of the public prosecutor(s) from all court prosecutors' offices at all levels under the Ministry of Justice. Sometimes public prosecutors will direct military police to handle large-scale searches or arrests when investigating cases of police-related crimes, prostitution, or fugitive recovery.

Regarding counter-terrorism, there are three company-size troops of special forces under the operational control of the Ministry of National Defense:
 Northern Taiwan: Military Police Special Service Company (MPSSC, Code Name: Night Hawk), Military Police Command.
 Central Taiwan: Special Warfare Special Service Company, Aviation, Airborne and Special Warfare Command of the Republic of China Army.
 Southern Taiwan: Marine Special Service Company, Marine Corps Command of the Republic of China Navy.
These three are tasked to handle combat situations involving international terrorists, mercenary or para-military criminals. Bound by laws, currently only the Military Police Special Service Company can react to non-military cases, like airplane hijacking.

Coast Guard

Fire Brigades

Taiwan Firemen were a part of the Taiwan Police before 1995. At that time, the Fire Policemen were not the most favorite people in the eyes of certain police chiefs. The most extreme case was in Taipei County (now New Taipei City) Police Department: the Taipei County Police Commissioner Yao Kao-Chiao (姚高橋) assigned all his fire policemen to kitchen duty because he felt his fire policemen were doing nothing except waiting for a fire to happen.

It is worth to point out that Yao Kao-Chiao was the Directors-General of Central Police University from May 1995 to June 1996, of National Police Agency from June 1996 to 1997, and of Coast Guard Administration from 28 January 2000 until 21 May 2000.

Also, in Taiwan, another contradiction was the radio call signs for the fire trucks or rescue vehicles. For reasons to avoid unwanted attentions and to remain secrecy, all radio call signs for all police vehicles were uncorrelated with the missions of the subject vehicles, unnecessarily including fire trucks, rescue vehicles, and ambulances of fire brigades. When fire police teams were responding to an emergency situation, these confusing call signs inevitably led to chaos and time delay. A successful fire chief, Chao Kang (趙鋼), convinced the police high command to rearrange the radio call sign assignment for all fire vehicles. Chao Kang then was appointed as the Commissioner of Taiwan Provincial Fire Administration, and the Director-General of National Fire Agency from 10 September 2000 to September 2002.

See also 
 Executive Yuan
 Ministry of the Interior (Taiwan)
 Ministry of Justice Investigation Bureau
 Coast Guard Administration (Taiwan)
 Republic of China Military Police
 Law enforcement agency

References

External links

 National Police Agency, MOI 
 National Police Administration from GlobalSecurity.org

Law enforcement agencies of Taiwan
Executive Yuan
National Central Bureaus of Interpol
Civil defense in Taiwan